Panch Kedar refers to five Hindu temples or holy places of the Shivaite sect dedicated to god Shiva. They are located in the Garhwal Himalayan region in Uttarakhand, India. They are the subject of many legends that directly link their creation to Pandavas, the heroes of the Hindu epic Mahabharata.

The Kedarnath is the main temple, which is part of four Chota Char Dhams (literally 'the small four abodes/seats') or pilgrimage centers of the Garhwal Himalayas; the other three dhams are the Badrinath, Yamunotri and Gangotri. Kedarnath is also one of the twelve Jyotirlingas.

The Garhwal region is also called the Kedar-Khanda after Kedar — the local name for Shiva. The region abounds in emblems and aniconic forms of Shaiva sect of Shiva, much more than the Vaishnava sect. The western part of this region in particular, which constitutes half of Chamoli district being known as Kedar-Kshetra or Kedar mandala, encompasses in its ambit all the five temples constituting the Panch Kedar.

Visitors to Kedarnath shrine, the first of the Panch Kedar temples for which records are available, was an impressive 557,923 in 2007 as against 87,629 in 1987, a quantum jump in 20 years.

History
It is said that the Panch Kedar Yatra (pilgrimage) could be directly related to the Gorakhnath Sampradaya (recognized for their pilgrim traditions) of Nepal. As a proof, it is stated that the culmination of the pilgrimage was at Pashupatinath temple in Nepal, rightly where Shiva's head is worshipped and not at Kedarnath where the hump is venerated. A further supporting fact mentioned in this regard is that the emblem used in Kedarnath temple dome is the same as displayed in the Pashupathinath temple dome in Kathmandu.

Legends
Many folk legends related to the Garhwal region, Shiva and the creation of the Panch Kedar temples are narrated.

A folk legend about Panch Kedar relates to the Pandavas, the heroes of the Hindu epic Mahabharata. The Pandavas defeated and slayed their cousins — the Kauravas in the epic Kurukshetra war. They wished to atone for the sins of committing fratricide (gotra hatya) and Brāhmanahatya (killing of Brahmins — the priest class) during the war. On the advice of Krishna, they handed over the reins of their kingdom to their kin and left in search of Shiva and to seek his blessings. First, they went to the holy city of Varanasi (Kashi), believed to be Shiva's favourite city and known for its Shiva temple. But, Shiva wanted to avoid them as he was deeply incensed by the death and dishonesty at the Kurukshetra war and was, therefore, insensitive to Pandavas' prayers. Therefore, he assumed the form of a bull (Nandi) and hid in the Garhwal region.

Not finding Shiva in Varanasi, the Pandavas went to Garhwal Himalayas. Bhima, the second of the five Pandava brothers, then standing astride two mountains started to look for Shiva. He saw a bull grazing near Guptakashi (“hidden Kashi” — the name derived from the hiding act of Shiva). Bhima immediately recognized the bull to be Shiva. Bhima caught hold of the bull by its tail and hind legs. But the bull-formed Shiva disappeared into the ground to later reappear in parts, with the hump raising in Kedarnath, the arms appearing in Tungnath, the face showing up at Rudranath, the nabhi (navel) and stomach surfacing in Madhyamaheshwar and the hair appearing in Kalpeshwar. It is believed that Shiva's throat fell on the Kedarkantha mountain. The Pandavas pleased with this reappearance in five different forms, built temples at the five places for venerating and worshipping Shiva. The Pandavas were thus freed from their sins.

A variant of the tale credits Bhima of not only catching the bull, but also stopping it from disappearing. Consequently, the bull was torn asunder into five parts and appeared at five locations in the Kedar Khand of Garhwal region of the Himalayas. After building the Panch Kedar Temples, the Pandavas meditated at Kedarnath for salvation, performed yagna (fire sacrifice) and then through the heavenly path called the Mahapanth (also called Swargarohini), attained heaven or salvation.. The Panch Kedar Temples are constructed in the North-Indian Himalayan Temple architecture with the Kedarnath, Tungnath and Madhyamaheshwar temples constructed in a similar manner.

After completing the pilgrimage of Shiva's darshan at the Panch Kedar Temples, it is an unwritten religious rite to visit Vishnu at the Badrinath Temple, as a final affirmatory proof by the devotee that he has sought blessings of Shiva.

Worship rights
The priests and pundits who worship in the Panch Kedar temples are from South India, except in Tungnath. Jangamas who areVeerashaiva
Lingayats founded by Panchacharyas are the chief priests at the  Kedarnath and Madhyamaheswar  temple.The chief priest of kedarnath is called Rawal and Jagadguru. Dasnami Gosains founded by Adi Shankaracharya are the chief priests in Rudranath and Kalpeshwar temples. The Tunganath temple is served by the Khasi Brahmins. In the case of Tungnath, it is also said that the local Brahmins from Mokumath officiate as priests.

Geography
The five temples lie ensconced in the region of the Upper Himalayas with the high, snow-covered hill ranges of the Nanda Devi, Chaukhamba, Kedarnath and Neelkanth peaks forming their backdrop. Kedarnath is located in the Mandakini River valley while the other shrines are situated in the highlands between the Mandakini valley and the Alakananda gorge. They are so remotely located that except Kalpeshwar, the other four are still not accessible by motorable roads but reached by strenuous trekking, starting from late April or early May till early October. For the rest of year (the winter season), the shrines are closed due to heavy snowfall. (See External links for schematic maps of the locations of Panch Kedar).

The village of Kedarnath is on the edge of Kedarnath mountain slope in a remote northern part of the Garhwal Himalayas. Kedarnath ranges drain into the Mandakini River that emerges from the steady edge of the Churabre glacier and forms the picturesque Mandakini valley. The Dudhganga, Madhuganga, Swargaduari and Saraswathi are the streams that flow in the valley behind the Kedarnath temple. Also seen close to the temple are four sacred ponds called Retah, Udak, Rudra and Rishi. Tunganath has an impressive backdrop of the peaks of Panchulli, Nanda Devi, Dunagiri, Kedarnath and Bandar Poonch. The Vaitarani stream flows near Rudranath. Kalpeshwar is located in the Urgam valley in a dense forest area. Urgam Valley has apple orchards, terraced fields where potato is grown extensively. Kalp Ganga river, a tributary of the Alaknanda, flows through the valley.

Access by trekking
The Panch Kedar temples are accessible by only from the nearest road heads but in different directions, lengths and scale of difficulty (ruggedness, steepness and snow cover). The trek routes located in the Garhwal region provide a dazzling and enchanting display of the high snow peaks of Nanda Devi, Trishul and Chaukhamba. Garhwal region is where the most worshipped Ganga River and its many tributaries originate adding to the reverence of the Panch Kedar temples.

The trek starts from Gauri Kund, which has views of the Himalayan range of hills. The trekking is undertaken during two seasons; three months during summer and two months after the monsoon season, as during the rest of the period, except Kalpeshwar, the other four Panch Kedar temples are inaccessible due to snow cover.
 
The road from Rishikesh is the first entry point to Garhwal from the plains of Uttarakhand. The road from Rishikesh leads to the Gaurikhund on the Rudraprayag–Kedarnath road from where the trekking would start to Kedarnath temple. From Jagasu, the trek to Madhaymaheshwar temple via Gaundhar is over a distance of. This trek provides views of the Chaukhamba, the Kedarnath and the Neelkanth peaks. After the Tunganath trek, the drive along the road up to Mandal (known Cherrapunji of Garhwal due to heavy rainfall) is for a distance of. After visiting Rudranath temple the return journey is to Mandal and the drive down by road to Helang. From Helang, the trek to Kalpeshwar temple is for  via Urgam village and is considered strenuous due to the steepness of the route.

The nearest airport is Jolly Grant, Dehradun. The nearest railway station is Rishikesh.

Worship during winter season
During the winter period when the temples are inaccessible due to snowfall, the sanctified symbolic Shiva idol of Kedarnath is worshipped at the Omkareshwar temple at Ukhimath, the representational idol of Tunganath is worshipped at Makkumath, the Rudranath symbolic image is brought to Gopeshwar, and the Madhyamaheshwar symbolic idol is venerated at Ukhimath.

Kalpeshwar is the only temple of the sacred Panch Kedar that remains open throughout the year.

References

External links
 Locations of Panch Kedar - Schematic sketch
Panch Kedar, trek map, page 78

Related Yatras
 Panch Prayag
 Chhota Char Dham

 
Shiva temples in Uttarakhand
Hindu temples in Uttarakhand